Depressaria macrotrichella is a moth in the family Depressariidae. It was described by Hans Rebel in 1917. It is found in northern Iran and Egypt.

References

Moths described in 1917
Depressaria
Moths of Africa
Moths of Asia